Fairfield Avenue station is a SEPTA Media-Sharon Hill Trolley Line station in Upper Darby, Pennsylvania. It is officially located at Fairfield Avenue and Terminal Square, but the intersection also includes Bywood Avenue, which is a one-way street running west along the lines until the Beverly Boulevard station. The stop serves both Routes 101 and 102. Only local service is provided on both lines. This station is the penultimate stop on the Media-Sharon Hill Trolleys before reaching the 69th Street Terminal. The Upper Darby Post Office can be found on the north side of the station.  The parking lot adjacent to the station is privately owned serving mainly a church and an H Mart.

Trolleys arriving at this station travel between 69th Street Terminal just to the northeast, and either Orange Street in Media, Pennsylvania for the Route 101 line, or Sharon Hill, Pennsylvania for the Route 102 line. Trolleys arriving from either Media or Sharon Hill run on a right-of-way along Bywood Avenue in the opposite direction of the street, while those leaving 69th Street run along the median of Terminal Square. It contains two platforms, but only one pre-fabricated shelter on the south side of the tracks. While part of the given address is at Terminal Square, both platforms and the shed are actually located on Bywood Avenue west of Fairfield Avenue.

Station layout

External links

Route 102 Local Trolley at Fairfield Avenue Station (WorldNYCSubway.org)
 Station from Fairfield Avenue from Google Maps Street View

SEPTA Media–Sharon Hill Line stations